The Accrington Observer is a weekly paper featuring the town of Accrington and its surrounding areas. It is published by Reach plc.

The Accrington Observer is the sister paper of the Rossendale Free Press.

Accrington
Mass media in Hyndburn
Newspapers published in Lancashire
Newspapers published by Reach plc